Wichern is a surname. Notable people with the surname include:

Caroline Wichern (1836–1906), German music educator and composer, daughter of Johann
Johann Hinrich Wichern (1808–1881), German Lutheran theologian, founder of the Home Mission
Nadine Jean Wichern Chief, Civil Appeals Division, Office of the Attorney General of the State of Illinois (2015-present)